Wine Country most commonly refers to California's Wine Country, in the northern San Francisco Bay Area.

Wine Country may also refer to:
Woodinville wine country, an area north of Seattle that features some of Washington State's largest and oldest wineries
 List of wine-producing regions, a list of areas in the world where wine grapes are produced that may colloquially be referred to as "Wine Country"
 Wine Country Broadcasting, network of radio stations in Northern California's wine country
 Wine Country (film), a 2019 American comedy film